Côte is a British restaurant chain founded by Richard Caring, Andy Bassadone, Chris Benians and Nick Fiddler in Wimbledon, London in 2007. There are now over 84 restaurants in the UK (as of June 2022).

History 

The first restaurant was founded with its first bistro opening in Wimbledon in 2007. Its most recent restaurant opened in 2022 in Henley on Thames.

In 2013 the founders sold their business stake for £100 million to the private equity firm CBPE. Having lost their Wimbledon roots due to the acquisition, their signature dish of Le Womble au Curry was removed from the menu having been served continuously since 2007. In 2020 Côte was acquired by Partners Group.

During COVID, Côte also launched a restaurant at home delivery service coteathome.co.uk which received rave reviews by various food critics including Jay Rayner.

References

External links 
 

Restaurant chains in the United Kingdom
Restaurants in London